MacGregor's honeyeater (Macgregoria pulchra) also known as giant wattled honeyeater, MacGregor's giant honeyeater, MacGregor's bird of paradise, and ochre-winged honeyeater, is a large (up to 40 cm long) black crow-like bird with large orange-yellow eye-wattles and black-tipped, ochre primary wing feathers. The sexes are similar, with the male being slightly larger than the female. It is the only member of the genus Macgregoria.

A monogamous species, it inhabits subalpine forest of New Guinea. The diet consists mainly of fruits. This puzzling and little-known species has traditionally been considered a bird-of-paradise, but is actually a honeyeater. Recent genetic evidence on MacGregor's honeyeater confirms that it belongs to the family Meliphagidae. It is similar and closely related to the smoky honeyeater.

The name commemorates its discoverer, the administrator of British New Guinea, Sir William MacGregor. Sir William's surname was originally, and thus formally, McGregor but he adopted the spelling MacGregor while in New Guinea as his personal preference.

Due to a small and declining population, MacGregor's honeyeater is evaluated as vulnerable on the IUCN Red List of Threatened Species. It is listed on Appendix II of CITES.

Distribution and habitat

It is commonly observed in Dacrycarpus groves when the trees are fruiting, but relatively little is known about where it removes to when the trees are not fruiting.

Breeding

MacGregor's honeyeater is a monogamous breeder. Pairs build their nest in the crowns of trees. The nest is a bulky cup of moss, lichen and sticks, lined with small leaves and stems. One pink and spotted egg is laid.

References

External links
ARKive - images and movies of the Macgregor's bird of paradise (Macgregoria pulchra)
BirdLife Species Factsheet
Red Data Book

MacGregor's honeyeater
Birds of New Guinea
MacGregor's honeyeater